Jasper Mills is an unincorporated community in Jasper Township, Fayette County, Ohio, United States. It is located along U.S. Route 22, three miles west of Washington Court House.

History
Jasper Mills had its start around 1854 when the railroad was extended to that point.  The community was named for a gristmill which operated there, and for Jasper Township, the township in which it is located. A post office called Jasper Mills was established at Jasper Mills in 1857, and remained in operation until 1876.

Gallery

References 

Unincorporated communities in Fayette County, Ohio
Unincorporated communities in Ohio
1854 establishments in Ohio
Populated places established in 1854